The 2002 Mr. Olympia contest was an IFBB professional bodybuilding competition held October 16–20, 2002 at the Mandalay Bay Arena in Las Vegas, Nevada.

Results

The total prize money awarded was $381,000.  A 2003 Cadillac Escalade was presented to the first-place winner by Mel Rich and Steve Stern of the Bodyonics Pinnacle company which donated the prize.
The Crowd was not happy when Gunter's position  was announced at 5th.

Notable events

Ronnie Coleman won his fifth consecutive Mr. Olympia title

See also
 2002 Ms. Olympia

References

External links 
 Mr. Olympia
 2002 Mr. Olympia posedown (video)

 2002
2002 in American sports
Mr. Olympia 2002
Mr. Olympia
2002 in bodybuilding